Theodor Hillenhinrichs (5 March 1901 – 27 May 1990) was a German politician from the Christian Democratic Union. From 15 March 1965 to 23 July 1966 he served as member of the Landtag of North Rhine-Westphalia.

References

1901 births
1990 deaths
Politicians from Lower Saxony
Members of the Landtag of North Rhine-Westphalia
Christian Democratic Union of Germany politicians
People from Vechta (district)